The 2017 San Marino and Rimini Riviera motorcycle Grand Prix was the thirteenth round of the 2017 MotoGP season. It was held at the Misano World Circuit Marco Simoncelli in Misano Adriatico on September 10, 2017. 

This race also set a new crash record, with 140 crashes across all three classes throughout the weekend, beating the number of crashes in the Estoril 2010 race, which had 130.

Classification

MotoGP

Moto2 race report
In the Moto2 class, Dominique Aegerter clinched his second win of his career and become the first Suter rider to win a race since Thomas Lüthi in the 2014 Valencia Grand Prix. However Aegerter was later disqualified due to oil infringement giving Thomas Lüthi his 2nd win of the season and closing the gap to Franco Morbidelli with five points.

Moto2

Moto3

 María Herrera suffered a broken collarbone in a crash during Sunday warm-up session and was declared unfit to start the race.
 Livio Loi suffered a broken collarbone in a collision with Gabriel Rodrigo during qualifying and withdrew from the event.

Championship standings after the race

MotoGP
Below are the standings for the top five riders and constructors after round thirteen has concluded.

Riders' Championship standings

Constructors' Championship standings

 Note: Only the top five positions are included for both sets of standings.

Moto2

Moto3

Notes

References

San Marino
San Marino and Rimini Riviera motorcycle Grand Prix
San Marino and Rimini Riviera motorcycle Grand Prix
San Marino and Rimini Riviera motorcycle Grand Prix